is a professional Japanese baseball player. He plays infielder for the Yokohama DeNA BayStars.

External links

 NPB.com

1996 births
Living people
People from Yatsushiro, Kumamoto
Baseball people from Kumamoto Prefecture
Japanese baseball players
Nippon Professional Baseball infielders
Yokohama DeNA BayStars players